Ralph Stob (1894 – 1965) was an educator, academic, and former president of Calvin College in Grand Rapids, Michigan. Stob was born in Chicago, Illinois, and attended Roseland Christian School. He felt called to Christian ministry. He enrolled in the preparatory curriculum of Calvin College in 1909 from which he graduated in 1915. He then enrolled and enrolled at the Seminary. Stob then accepted an appointment to teach classical languages at his alma mater. Teaching delayed his graduation from seminary until 1920. He continued to teach at Calvin while working during the summers on his graduate degrees at the University of Chicago.

Stob was a gifted and amiable teacher and was appointed President of Calvin College in 1933. During his tenure, he oversaw improvements to the curriculum and the beginning of a pension program for the staff. Faculty criticism, well-publicized student pranks, student criticism in the school newspaper, and student flouting of school rules made for a difficult presidency. In 1939, Stob returned to teaching Greek as effectively as before. In 1953 Stob was asked to assume the Chair of New Testament department in the Calvin Seminary. He retired from the seminary in 1964 and died the following year.

Stob and Evelyn L. Mokma were married in 1918 and they had three daughters.

1894 births
1965 deaths
Calvin University alumni
Calvin University faculty
Presidents of Calvin University
20th-century American academics